Phospholipase A2 group IVD is a protein that in humans is encoded by the PLA2G4D gene.

Function

The phospholipase A2 enzyme family, including PLA2G4D, catalyze the hydrolysis of glycerophospholipids at the sn-2 position and then liberate free fatty acids and lysophospholipids.

References

Further reading